The 2015 Sun Belt Conference baseball tournament will be held at Riddle–Pace Field on the campus of the Troy University in Troy, Alabama from May 20th to May 24th, 2015.  The tournament will again use a double-elimination format.  The winner of the tournament will earn the Sun Belt Conference's automatic bid to the 2015 NCAA Division I baseball tournament.

Seeding
The top eight teams (based on conference results) from the conference earn invites to the tournament.  The teams will be seeded based on conference winning percentage, and will then play a two bracket, double-elimination tournament.  The winner of each bracket will play a championship final.

Results

References

Tournament
Sun Belt Conference Baseball Tournament
Sun Belt Conference baseball tournament
Sun Belt Conference baseball tournament